Renzo Massarani (26 March 1898 – 28 March 1975) was an Italian composer. His work was part of the music event in the art competition at the 1936 Summer Olympics.

References

1898 births
1975 deaths
Italian male composers
Olympic competitors in art competitions
Musicians from Mantua
20th-century Italian male musicians